Code Lyoko: Evolution is a French teen drama science fiction television series created by Thomas Romain and Tania Palumbo and produced by the MoonScoop Group for France Télévisions, Lagardere Thematiques and Canal J, in association with Sofica Cofanim, Backup Media and B Media Kids. It is a live-action reboot of the French animated television series Code Lyoko. The series centers on a group of teenagers who travel to the virtual world of Lyoko to battle against a malignant artificial intelligence known as X.A.N.A. who threatens Earth with powers to access the real world and cause trouble. The scenes in the real world employ traditional animation with hand-painted backgrounds, while the scenes in Lyoko are presented in 3D CGI animation. It premiered on January 5, 2013 on France 4 and repeated 9 October 2016 on Boing. It blends live-action with CGI, picking up where the original series left off. In addition to improving upon the CGI in the original series, the soundtrack has been overhauled as well.

Although Evolution was never dubbed in English with an exception of the trailer, as of 29 October 2019 the episodes have been uploaded with French audio and English subtitles on the official Code Lyoko YouTube channel.

Plot
One year after the events of the animated series' thirty-episode fourth season, Aelita Schaeffer, Jeremy Belpois, Odd Della Robbia, Ulrich Stern, Yumi Ishiyama, and newly-welcomed William Dunbar return to their daily lives and routines at Kadic Academy. X.A.N.A., despite their success in defeating it previously, suddenly reappears, reborn with even more strength and power than ever before. The protagonists reactivate Franz Hopper's quantum supercomputer, which runs the virtual world Lyoko, and resume their former double lives in order to protect humanity from the threat of X.A.N.A. once again. Joined by William Dunbar, who has finally been accepted as the sixth Lyoko Warrior, and an unreliable girl-genius named Laura Gauthier, the seven heroes are bent on unraveling the reasons for such a return and to exterminate X.A.N.A., the autonomous, sentient multi-agent system/artificial intelligence that is threatening humanity once again.

X.A.N.A. is currently unable to take over the network due to it missing some of its essential "Source Codes," which it injected into the Lyoko Warriors, except for William, during their final virtualization in the original series, and is now trying to steal them back through its polymorphic specters. Jeremy reasons that if X.A.N.A. regains all of its Codes, it will take over the internet again and nothing will stop it. One benefit to having Codes, however, is that the carrier can deactivate towers on Lyoko under X.A.N.A.'s control, making all but William capable of doing so, as opposed to just Aelita alone. With the help of Laura, Jeremy works to write a virus that will be capable of hopefully eradicating X.A.N.A. for good this time.

In addition to X.A.N.A., the gang eventually discover that they have another dangerous enemy, a Swiss mad scientist named Professor Lowell Tyron, who seems to be the one responsible for unintentionally reactivating X.A.N.A.. He claims to have no knowledge of X.A.N.A., despite its high level of activity in the Cortex system, which is a Replika (a virtual world that is similar to Lyoko) that Tyron created. He commands a group of several virtual human avatars in green and black-striped ninja-like costumes to counter the Lyoko Warriors' efforts to hack into his system. In Professor Tyron's lab, the group also discovers Aelita's long-lost mother, Anthea. They seek to discover why she is with their new enemy and how to reunite Anthea and her daughter.

In the cliffhanger finale, it is revealed that Prof. Tyron has been married to Anthea for four years now, making him Aelita's stepfather. Tyron attempts to coerce Aelita into telling her friends to abort their plan to destroy the Cortex and coming with him, as he has legal custody of her, or risk never seeing her mother again. Aelita ultimately chooses to forsake her mother and go through with their original plan, and Tyron orders his subordinates to shut down his supercomputer while the Lyoko Warriors are still inside. They barely escape, having just injected Jeremy's virus into the core of the Cortex, which means that X.A.N.A. would be destroyed upon rebooting of Tyron's supercomputer, unless either X.A.N.A. was able to back itself up, or Tyron is able to repair his supercomputer, and by extension, X.A.N.A. along with it; never truly confirming whether X.A.N.A. was entirely destroyed a second time nor the identities of the Ninjas and the long awaited reunion between Aelita and Anthea.

Episodes

Characters

Main
Jeremie Belpois (French: Jérémie Belpois)
Portrayed by: Marin Lafitte 
A thirteen-year-old computer genius and top student in class, Jeremy was the one who originally found the Supercomputer in the nearby abandoned factory and turned it on, beginning the group's struggle against X.A.N.A.. He believed he'd defeated X.A.N.A. using a multi-agent system of his own creation in the finale of Code Lyoko and was dubious that X.A.N.A. had returned at the start of Code Lyoko: Evolution. Once the Lyoko Warriors start fighting X.A.N.A. again, Jeremy returns to his workaholic nature, often staying up late to work on programs such as the virus he intends to use to destroy the Cortex. He spends a lot of time working alongside Laura, causing Aelita to become jealous. He is able to outsmart both X.A.N.A. and Professor Tyron most of the time, and even Laura Gauthier.

Aelita Schaeffer
Portrayed by: Léonie Berthonnaud
Primarily known by her alias, Aelita Stones, she's the smartest of the group alongside Jeremy. Her father, Franz Hopper, created the Supercomputer, Lyoko and X.A.N.A., and ultimately sacrificed himself to try and stop X.A.N.A. once and for all. Aelita sometimes struggles with the reality of his death and the return of the enemy he died trying to defeat. She has a strong bond with Jeremy but his relationship with Laura causes her to be jealous. After she finds out that her mother, Anthea, is alive and working with Professor Tyron, Aelita is determined to contact her so that they can reunite. Aelita has been implanted with some of X.A.N.A.'s source codes, making her a primary target for its polymorphic specters.
On Lyoko, Aelita has pointed elf ears and the ability to summon a pair of white-and-pink angel wings in order to fly and carry another with her. Her "weapon" is her "energy fields," orbs of pure pink electricity that can be thrown to destroy an enemy from a distance. She can also generate a large energy shield made of the same sort of pink plasma by combining it with her creativity. She is able to still deactivate towers on Lyoko, due to the annex program she has had for several years. Due to the similarities between Tyron's supercomputer and her father's, Aelita is able to open the door of the Core Room in the Cortex with her creativity, a blue aura around her body as opposed to her melodic siren-like sounds. Her additional psychic ability of second sight is not used.

Odd Della Robbia
Portrayed by: Gulliver Bevernaege
The comic relief of the group and a bad student who isn't interested in studying. He shares a dorm with Ulrich, where he used to keep his dog Kiwi. Between the events of Code Lyoko and Code Lyoko: Evolution, Odd sent Kiwi home to stay with his four elder sisters, but he misses his dog dearly. He is considered a ladies' man and spends most of the series pursuing his love interest Samantha Suarez. His hair is now brown instead of blond, but retains the purple streak at the front. Odd has been implanted with some of X.A.N.A.'s source codes and is a target for X.A.N.A.'s specters.
On the virtual worlds of Lyoko and the Cortex, Odd is like a cat, having a tail and clawed gloves which he can use to climb walls. He can summon an additional set of gauntlets over his gloves that shoot many blue six "laser arrows" all at once, wiping out several monsters or ninjas from a distance, something he was incapable of doing in the original show. While he still retains some of X.A.N.A.'s source codes, he is fully capable of deactivating towers on Lyoko, an ability he loses in "Massacre." As with the original show, his only psychic ability of "future flash" is never given back to him nor his once spatial ability of teleportation, even though he tries to get Jeremie to upgrade/modify weaponry and greatly strengthen each of their superpowers or even give them new and stronger ones entirely, like purple laser eyes for him, to which Jeremie decided against said upgrades/modifications and advancements, despite the fact that they would make his five best friends' considerably stronger on both Lyoko and the Cortex.
Ulrich Stern
Portrayed by: Quentin Merabet
A more reserved member of the group, Ulrich has a hard time sharing his feelings. His parents pressure him to achieve well in school, but he has difficulty learning and living up to their expectations. In his off-time he practices karate and judo with Yumi, whom he has a crush on. He often butts heads with William, who he sees as a rival. Ulrich has been implanted with some of X.A.N.A.'s source codes and is a target for its polymorphic specters.

On Lyoko, Ulrich wields dual katanas. His "super sprint" ability allows him to dash at high speeds and to run on walls, and his "triplicate" power lets him create two clones of himself which he controls mentally to confuse his targets. His "triangulate" ability is never used, even though it gives more of an advantage. He still retained some of X.A.N.A.'s source codes, being capable of deactivating towers on Lyoko until Episode 25 (122) "Massacre."

Yumi Ishiyama
Portrayed by: Mélanie Tran
A fairly reserved student who lives near and attends Kadic. She is the oldest of the group. She is of Japanese descent. She was initially very resistant to the idea of turning the Supercomputer back on again after signs of X.A.N.A.'s return. She practices judo with Ulrich, whom she has a mutual crush on, though it's not as obvious as Ulrich's crush on her. She's good friends with William, who's in her class, and doesn't like the idea of excluding him from the group now that X.A.N.A. has returned. Along with the rest of the Lyoko Warriors, she was implanted with some of X.A.N.A.'s source codes.

On Lyoko, Yumi's main weapons are a pair of Tessen fans which appear in her hands at will. Later on, Jeremy programs her a pink-and-white bō staff as well which she uses occasionally in only four episodes. Her superhuman balancing skills enable her to scale platforms quite easily without falling. She can deactivate towers on Lyoko as long as she still retains a few of X.A.N.A.'s source codes by the cliffhanger season finale "The Ultimate Mission". Her one-and-only power of telekinesis, which has been given a somewhat greater boost since the original show's Episode 69 "Double Take", is never used nor mentioned even once.

William Dunbar
Portrayed by: Diego Mestanza
An overconfident student in Yumi's class. William is initially kept uninformed about X.A.N.A.'s return because the group are distrustful of him. However, he eventually regains their trust and is allowed to fight alongside them. He still has feelings for Yumi but is more respectful of her boundaries. He has a rivalry with Ulrich. As he wasn't present on Lyoko during the final battle of the original series, he wasn't implanted with any of X.A.N.A.'s source codes.
On Lyoko, he retains his black outfit and some of his powers from his time under X.A.N.A.'s control: enhanced strength and "Supersmoke," which allows him to transform into a cloud of black smoke, move at great speed and even fly. His weapon is a giant sword which can release disc-shaped shock waves that can wipe out two monsters and Ninjas from a distance. He has not used his levitation ability.

Laura Gauthier
Portrayed by: Pauline Serieys
The temporary seventh member of the Lyoko Warriors. She's a highly intelligent student, rivaling Jeremy in class, and has a keen interest in computing. She discovers Lyoko, the factory, and the Supercomputer after following William to the factory without his noticing. Her main role is to assist Jeremy in matters that even Aelita could not help in, such as advanced coding and constructing viruses. She is generally viewed with suspicion by the others due to her uninitiated status. She lacks sympathy towards Aelita's situation and enjoys spending time with Jeremy, so Aelita displays some animosity towards her. When Laura rebels against Jeremy, goes to the factory with William and sends him to the Cortex, William nearly gets captured by X.A.N.A. as he did in the original series. After the Lyoko Warriors stop the Scyphozoa from fully possessing William, Jeremy kicks Laura out of the group and erases her memories of the factory, the supercomputer and Lyoko. However, due to having a certain card in her bag, she inadvertently and unknowingly gives Tyron direct information on the whereabouts of his teenage adversaries. She appeared in just twelve episodes. She shares the last name of Theo Gauthier, a Kadic student who debuted in the original show's episode "Claustrophobia", however both he and Laura are not related.

Antagonists
X.A.N.A.
Sometimes spelled XANA. A very powerful and dangerous multi-agent system or artificial intelligence that returns from Code Lyoko to serve as the main antagonist of the new series. After its supposed destruction in the original series, it was revealed in Code Lyoko: Evolution that X.A.N.A. survived by taking refuge in the Cortex, a sector generated by Professor Tyron's supercomputer. X.A.N.A. activates towers on Lyoko and sends specters in the form of human beings to get close to the heroes and drain them of its source codes, which are a share of its power implanted in them before its previous downfall. X.A.N.A. is determined to become complete again so it can take full control of the world network. Even though the team's supercomputer gets shut off again, it does not effect the A.I. since stealing the Keys of Lyoko from Aelita in the animated show.

X.A.N.A.'s Monsters
The virtual creatures X.A.N.A. uses to protect the towers it has activated and try to stop the heroes from accessing them, or to stop them from reaching the center of the Cortex. There are several different types of monsters, some inspired by real-life animals. X.A.N.A. also sometimes sends monsters to keep Tyron's Ninja avatars from finding out about X.A.N.A.'s presence in his supercomputer.

Professor Lowell Tyron
Portrayed by: Franck Beckmann
The secondary antagonist, responsible for the creation of the Cortex within his own quantum supercomputer in Switzerland. His character is unintentionally responsible for X.A.N.A.'s rebirth as well as antagonizing Jeremy and his friends. He used to work with Franz Hopper, but was fired after not listening to his instructions and being too conceited. He later betrayed him by stealing blueprints to create his own supercomputer. After an unknown sequence of events, he married Anthea; this also makes him Aelita's stepfather.

Ninjas
Human avatars, similar to the five Lyoko Warriors, that are sent to the Cortex by Professor Tyron when necessary from his laboratory somewhere in Switzerland. Tyron lacks the technology to virtualize human beings directly into a virtual world, so he equips his staff with special suits that allow them to control Ninja avatars on the Cortex. Each Ninja is identical: faceless and green with white stripes, and armed with dual swords. They're masters of martial arts and stealth, with the ability to melt into the floor and resurface behind an enemy to take them by surprise, they also have the ability to Super Sprint like Ulrich and use telekinesis to freeze enemies like Yumi. They're also able to travel across the Digital Sea without any protection. Their mission is to stop the Lyoko Warriors from interfering with the Cortex, and they make formidable opponents. Their identities are never revealed.

Supporting
Jim Morales (French: Jim Moralès)
Portrayed by: Bastien Thelliez
The physical education teacher at Kadic Academy and the chief disciplinarian. He often makes long speeches about the sports he teaches, or begins to reminisce about stories of his past before being interrupted by someone or cutting himself off. He can be quite serious when rules are broken, but he's also kind towards students in need. The heroes often cross him but his memory is usually erased by a Return to the Past.

Samantha Suarez
Portrayed by: Louise Vallat
Odd's love interest. She seems to have known Odd for a long time, but Samantha only started boarding at Kadic Academy recently after a dispute with her father. Odd begins to pursue her as a love interest, even buying her a thousand red roses when he believes he's won the lottery. Samantha is hesitant about starting a relationship with him, most likely due to the fact that Odd can't tell her the truth about why he keeps running off. She acts as a replacement to Sam Knight, a character from the original show who was one of Odd's ex-girlfriends.

Anthea Schaeffer
Portrayed by: Sandrine Rigaux
The long-lost mother of Aelita and widow of the late Waldo Franz Shaffer. In the original series, Anthea was kidnapped by men in black suits when Aelita was very young and her fate was never known. In Code Lyoko: Evolution, however, she is revealed be very much alive and working alongside Professor Tyron, and under the impression that her daughter was dead. She and Tyron married five years prior to the events of the sequel. After Aelita manages to contact her mother and tell her that she's alive, Anthea sends her back a message expressing her happiness and her wish that Aelita come to Switzerland to live with her and her husband. Unfortunately, the sequel concluded before more episodes of the group's mission to find her and reunite her with Aelita were made in a second season.

Elisabeth "Sissi" Delmas
Portrayed by: Clémency Haynes
The principal's daughter and a student at Kadic Academy. Unlike in the original series, she dyed her hair blonde and no longer seems interested in Ulrich, she also tries to make friends with Aelita and Yumi.

Jean-Pierre Delmas
Portrayed by: Eric Soubelet.
The principal of Kadic Academy and Sissi's father. His is very gullible which makes it better for the quintet to keep their secret as heroes from everyone. Unlike the first series he shaved his beard and no longer wears glasses.

Suzanne Hertz
Portrayed by: Sophie Fougère
A science teacher at Kadic who replaced Franz Hopper, as she was once his assistant. She now appears to be middle aged as her hair is shoulder-length and honey-colored as opposed to gray.

Waldo Franz Schaeffer
Portrayed by: Hugues Massinat.
Primarily known by his alias, Franz Hopper, he is the late father of Aelita and first husband of Anthea Hopper-Tyron. He had died sacrificing himself to assist Jeremy in wiping out X.A.N.A. once and for all, at least for a time, in the penultimate episode of the original series and only appears in old videos or photographs. His very essence seems to be linked with the Heart of Lyoko itself, as Aelita is known to be speaking to something or someone when wanting to consult him about whether he had anything to do with X.A.N.A.'s sudden return, and later assures him that she will do everything in her power to find his wife. His archives on his work regarding the supercomputer and Lyoko have fallen in the hands of his former colleague via Anthea marrying Professor Lowell.

Cast

Main

Supporting

Production
The budget for the series was expected to be €5,600,000.

Jérôme Mouscadet, who served as director of Code Lyoko, and Sophie Decroisette, head writer for the original show's first 3 seasons, were involved early in Evolution before leaving due to creative differences. Decroisette specifically wrote the bible for Evolution and synopses for the first couple episodes with Mouscadet, but ultimately left after "I... saw that production wanted to be on a particular story level that didn't agree with my ideas for the series."

See also

 List of French television series
Code Lyoko

References

External links 

 

Evolution
2010s French television series
2010s teen drama television series
2013 French television series debuts
2013 French television series endings
Television series about artificial intelligence
Works set in computers
French action television series
French adventure television series
French action adventure television series
French drama television series
French science fiction television series
French time travel television series
Fiction about mind control
Television series about parallel universes
Television series about robots
Television series with live action and animation
Television series about teenagers
Television shows about spirit possession
Television shows about virtual reality
Anime-influenced Western animated television series
Television shows set in Paris
Television shows set in France
Television series by Splash Entertainment
Malware in fiction
Superhero television series
Cyberpunk television series
Space adventure television series
Teen superhero television series
France Télévisions original programming
Sequel television series
Works based on animated television series